Pseudocalamobius pubescens is a species of beetle in the family Cerambycidae. It was described by Hasegawa in 1987.

References

Agapanthiini
Beetles described in 1987